Leptospermum riparium, commonly known as riverine tea-tree, is a species of straggling shrub that is endemic to Tasmania. It has flaky bark, crowded, lance-shaped leaves with the narrower end towards the base, relatively large white flowers and fruit that remain on the plant when mature. It grows on river banks in rainforest.

Description
There are reddish-brown bracts and bracteoles at the base of the flower buds but that usually fall off before the flower opens.

Taxonomy and naming
Leptospermum riparium was first formally described in 1974 by Tasmanian botanist Dennis Ivor Morris in Records of the Queen Victoria Museum, based on specimens he collected near the bridge over the Huon River in the Tahune Forest Park. The specific epithet (riparium) is from a Latin word meaning "inhabiting river banks".

Distribution and habitat
The riverine tea-tree grows along major rivers in rainforest of southern and eastern Tasmania.

References

 riparium
Myrtales of Australia
Flora of Tasmania
Plants described in 1974